Bibersteinia is a Gram-negative and non-motile, genus of bacteria from the family of Pasteurellaceae with one known species (Bibersteinia trehalosi). Bibersteinia is named after Ernst L. Biberstein. Bibersteinia trehalosi is a pathogen of sheep and can cause systemic infections in sheep.

References

Further reading
 Pathogenicity of Bibersteinia trehalosi in bovine calves 
 
 

Pasteurellales
Bacteria genera